Eleonora Vild Đoković (Serbian Cyrillic: Елеонора Вилд Ђоковић; born June 9, 1969) is a Serbian former basketball player who competed for Yugoslavia in the 1988 Summer Olympics. She was born in Bačka Topola.

External links
Sportski savez grada Subotice - Eleonora Wild
profile at sports references

1969 births
Living people
People from Bačka Topola
Olympic basketball players of Yugoslavia
Basketball players at the 1988 Summer Olympics
Olympic silver medalists for Yugoslavia
Olympic medalists in basketball
Yugoslav women's basketball players
Serbian women's basketball players
Shooting guards
ŽKK Crvena zvezda players
ŽKK Spartak Subotica players
Medalists at the 1988 Summer Olympics
Serbian expatriate basketball people in Germany